The Brothers' Circle or Bratski Krug is a term used to refer to Russian organized crime, commonly the Russian mafia. It is a loose translation of the Russian term "Bratva" (Russian: Братва), which can also be loosely translated as “brotherhood” or “band of brothers". The term "bratva" received its wide dissemination in the 1990s after the collapse of the Soviet Union, and was used as an informal address among the members of many gangs which spread throughout post-soviet republics. Today the term is used as an informal way of address among close friends. This form of address and lack of proper interpretation resulted in its name being used in connection to Russian organized crime.

U.S. Department of the Treasury officials suggest that it operates in the Middle East, Africa, Latin America, and the United States, and is controlled by Vladislav Leontyev, a Russian man from Nizhny Novgorod.
In 2011 the group was defined by the Obama administration of the United States in the "Strategy on Combating Transnational Organized Crime", as "A multiethnic criminal group composed of leaders and senior members of several criminal organizations largely based in countries of Europe. Many Brothers' Circle's members share a common ideology based on the thief in law tradition, which seeks to spread their brand of criminal influence around the world."

Debate over existence
Mark Galeotti, an expert on Eurasian security, has stated that: "I have not found anyone in Russian law enforcement or elsewhere who actually says 'yes, the Brothers' Circle is an organization and it exists. As such the label Brothers' Circle could be seen as an attempt to connect disparate criminal gangs." In June 2012, with the designation of five more kingpins, Galeotti restated his opinion that the Brothers' Circle did not exist as a specific gang, but noted that the sanctions were in fact targeting members of Aslan Usoyan's criminal network.

Alleged members

Zakhar Kalashov
Vasiliy Khristoforov
Kamchy Kolbayev
Vladislav Leontyev
Gafur Rakhimov
Lazar Shaybazyan
Alexey Zaytsev

See also
Georgian mafia
Russian mafia
Transnational crime

References

Factions of the Russian Mafia
Kyrgyzstani gangsters
Uzbekistani gangsters
Gangsters from Georgia (country)
Secret societies related to organized crime
Transnational organized crime